The Cincinnati Subway was a partially completed rapid transit system beneath the streets of Cincinnati, Ohio. Construction began in the early 1900s as an upgrade to the Cincinnati streetcar system, but was abandoned due to escalating costs, the collapse of funding amidst political bickering, and the Great Depression during the 1920s and 1930s.

In 1928, the construction of the subway system in Cincinnati was indefinitely canceled. There are no plans to revive the project.

History

Rapid transit was seen as the solution for downtown congestion in Cincinnati during the first quarter of the 20th century. Six million dollars were allocated for the project, but construction was delayed due to World War I. Unexpected post-war inflation doubled the cost of construction, so the project could not be finished at the original estimated price.

Various attempts to use the subway tunnels for mass transit have been unsuccessful. Political squabbling, the Great Depression, World War II, and the increased usage of the automobile have contributed to the failure of the proposals. Today, many Cincinnatians are unaware of the tunnels beneath them.

Context

From 1825 to 1920 the Miami and Erie Canal divided Cincinnati's residential neighborhood of Over-the-Rhine from the business district of downtown. The canal was used to transport goods and people from the Great Lakes to the Ohio River and subsequently the Mississippi River via Cincinnati, until the popularity of railroads caused it to become disused. The canal then became very polluted due to people dumping trash in it and using it as a sewer. The canal became unprofitable by 1856 and was abandoned by the city in 1877.

On September 15, 1883, a weekly Cincinnati magazine called The Graphic proposed that the "dead old ditch" be used to provide an unobstructed route for a subway system, with a large boulevard above.

Cincinnati began adopting electric streetcars in 1888; this soon became the main form of public transportation. During this period Cincinnati was one of the seven most populous US citiesand had a rate of growth and economic importance that was similar to that of New York City and Chicago. The slow streetcars shared the crowded streets with horse-drawn carriages and people, and collided with the first automobiles on an almost daily basis. It was not unusual for trips between downtown and the surrounding suburbs to take 45 minutes to an hour. Despite having  of streetcar tracks, the city found itself in a growing traffic nightmare.

Another newspaper, the Cincinnati Commercial Tribune, gave encouraging words to the public and said "We believe that the city we love, our home, is at the turning point, and that with the coming of Rapid Transit we will have the beginning of a Greater, More Prosperous, Healthier and Happier Cincinnati. We believe that a Vote for the Loop is a Vote for the best interests of all of us, and it is with pride that we state that every newspaper in the city is for the Loop, and practically all of the Business organizations as well as the Trades Unions." This helped the project win the fight in the polls when the people of Cincinnati enthusiastically passed bill to start construction.

Planning
In 1910, Henry Thomas Hunt spearheaded plans for a new rapid transit system. The next year, City Council convinced the Ohio State Legislature to lease the city's portion of the canal for use as a boulevard and subway system. The city hired experts who had worked on Boston's and Chicago's rapid transit systems to research the best possible implementation for Cincinnati's rapid transit system. The result were four "Schemes", or proposed routes. The chosen plan—Scheme IV, modification H—looped around the city hitting the central suburbs of St. Bernard and Norwood, the eastern suburbs of Oakley and Hyde Park, and then returned into downtown.

In 1916, City Council authorized a bond issue of $6 million with an interest rate of 4.25 percent, and then held a plebiscite on the rapid transit plan. The bond was supposed to fund a  subway system stretching across Cincinnati, which would, in turn, slow or even stop the decline of Cincinnati's population at the time. One advertisement in support of the subway proclaimed, "Every newspaper in the city is for the Loop, and practically all of the Business organizations as well as the Trades Unions." On April 17, 1917, Cincinnati citizens voted in favor of using the bond for a Rapid Transit system, 30,165 to 14,286. The system would be built as a below grade, at grade and elevated railway. Underground portion to be built in the Miami and Erie Canal bed through downtown. Extend through the Mill Creek valley to St. Bernard, Norwood, Oakley.

Proposed route: description from 1916 bond campaign 

Follows canal bed from Walnut Street to Carthage Pike.
 Exceptions – Marshall Avenue, Bates Avenue and bend south of Ludlow Avenue, for the purpose of eliminating curves in canal bed that are so sharp as to be impossible to operate at high speed.
 Subway: Fourth and Walnut Street to Brighton.
 Open subway: Brighton to Bates Avenue.
 Open cut or fill: Bates Avenue to Crawford Station.
 Necessary covered section for approaches to Boulevard.
 Sassafras Street.
 Brashers Street.
 Ludlow Avenue.
 Open surface line in canal bed: Crawford Station to Carthage Pike, except at Mitchell Avenue, where it leaves canal bed and comes level to Mitchell Avenue.
 Street surface Line: Carthage Pike, Tennessee Avenue, Maple Avenue, Smith Road.
 Open cut or fill along Duck Creek Road on privet right of way: Oakley Station to Lake Avenue ravine (a short distance west of Potomac Avenue).
 Open cut or fill in Lake Avenue ravine from Lake Avenue ravine to Owls Nest Park.
 Subway under Owl’s Nest Park and Madison Road.
 Tunnel under Beechwood Subdivision (Wurlitzer Property).
 Concrete trestle along Ohio River bluff to Eden Park Reservoir.
 Steel elevated on Third, Martin, Pearl and Walnut Streets.
 Passes from elevated to subway between Third and Fourth Street on Walnut Street.
 Rapid Transit with no grade crossing from Oakley Station to Crawford Station by the way of downtown district.
 High speed surface line from Crawford Station to Oakley Station on north side.

Proposed stations-Scheme Four: Description from 1916 bond campaign 

 Oakley Station; at junction of smith Road and Duck Creek Road.
 Dana Station; near intersection of Dana and Duck Creek Road.
 Madison Station; at Madison Road, opposite Owl’s Nest Park.
 Butler Station; on Pearl Street, at Pennsylvania R. R. Station.
 Fountain Square Station; under Walnut Street at Fountain Square.
 Ninth Street Station; under Walnut Street, Between Eight and Ninth Street.
 Canal Station; Canal Street, between Elm and Vine Street.
 Liberty Station; in Canal bed, at Liberty Street.
 Brighton Station; in Canal bed, at Crosstown Bridge.
 Hopple Station; at the intersection of the Canal and Hopple Street.
 Ludlow Station; at the south end of the Ludlow Avenue Viaduct.
 Crawford Station; in the Canal Right of Way, opposite Spring Grove Cemetery.

However, because the United States entered World War I just 11 days earlier, construction was halted because no capital issues of bonds were permitted during the war.

Construction and failure
When the war ended in 1918, costs had risen due to inflation. By 1919 the cost of construction had increased, bringing the original price to complete the loop from $12 million to around $13 million. Regardless, the city began work on January 28, 1920, at the current intersection of Walnut Street and Central Parkway, and the city planned to raise the money to complete the loop later, since funds were so low and there was a shortage in construction materials. The subway's construction caused the foundations of buildings along the route to crack, leading to much litigation against the subway.
New estimates to complete the loop ranged from an additional $6-$12 million. The eastern part of the loop was later canceled as a cost-cutting measure. The boulevard that ran on top of the subway, Central Parkway, officially opened to traffic on October 1, 1928, and was followed by a week of public celebration. However, by the late 1920s, Prohibition had severely impacted the city, because alcoholic beverages, which were a major source of revenue for the city, were not allowed to be purchased. Still, as late as 1926 to 1927, new tunnels, such as the Hopple Street Tunnel, were being built.

Once it became apparent that the original rapid transit plan had failed, political infighting in City Hall stalled any new progress, due to an anti-City Hall campaign led by city manager Murray Seasongood beginning in 1920. Newspapers started to print articles arguing against the subway, using such rationales as the tight curves of the subway, and that its tunnels were too narrow to try to advocate against its completion.

Along with this, the cities of Norwood and Saint Bernard continuously negotiated with the city of Cincinnati, pushing construction back another year. Two more months were later piled on to the delay. Also, Brighton residents were upset with the blast damages destroying their property. The construction methods created suspicion to state examiners.

In January 1929, Seasongood – by then the Mayor – discontinued the Rapid Transit Commission, which until then had been in control of the subway's construction; that year, his own office took control of the project. Any hope of raising the money to complete the subway was further delayed with the stock market crash of 1929. Though few citizens owned automobiles when Mayor Hunt first planned rapid transit in 1910, their increasing usage helped fuel critics' arguments against a subway system. They began referring to the project as "Cincinnati's White Elephant." Even so, the "temporary" hiatus on construction was expected to end after the economy got better, and many Cincinnatians, including Seasongood, hoped that the subway would finally be completed.

Attempts at revival
There have been many attempts to complete the tunnels, but the reasons why the subway was never completed or used for another significant purpose are unclear. In 1936 the city commissioned the Engineers' Club of Cincinnati to produce a report on how to use the unfinished rapid transit property. The report could not find any use for the tunnels other than what they had been designed for. Because the city's needs had changed from twenty years earlier, the report suggested that the subway "should be forgotten". In 1939 the tunnels were researched for possible automobile traffic, but were found to be unsuitable for that use. In 1940 the city sought the advice of several experts to settle once and for all the fate of the subway. The report recommended placing all streetcar and trolley transportation underground (i.e., a subway), but Cincinnati already had too many other expensive public projects underway. In any case, the plan was put on hold yet again when the United States entered World War II in 1941.

During World War II the city was focused on wartime rationing, so completing the subway was not a high priority. The tunnels were suggested as possible air raid shelters, but the idea was never implemented. Underground storage of commercial and military supplies was also proposed as a use for the tunnels, or as a pathway to bring freight into the heart of the city, but both ideas were rejected because they would delay bringing mass transit to Cincinnati. After the war ended the City Planning Commission decided to not include the subway in its plans. Instead, the commission would use the loop's right-of-way as pathways for Interstate 75 and the Norwood Lateral. Then, in the 1950s, a massive  water main was laid in the northbound tunnel to save $300,000 by not digging a new tunnel for the water main. According to the engineering firm Parsons Brinckerhoff, a redundant water main was installed during the construction of Fort Washington Way so the water main in the subway could be removed easily. There is also an escape clause in Ordinance No. 154-1956 that states, "in the event said section of the rapid transit subway is, at some future date, needed for rapid transit purposes, the Water Works shall remove said main at its sole cost."

In the 1960s, Hamilton county proposed the Liberty Street station be turned into a bomb shelter. However, the result was a very weak attempt at a fallout shelter that would not have provided much for those residing in it. There were also suggestions by investors to turn the tunnels into passages for freight trains, but that project failed due to the sharp turns existing in the tunnels that freight trains could not handle.

The subway bonds were paid off in 1966 at a total cost of $13,019,982.45. Around that time Meier's Wine Cellars Inc. wanted to use the subway tunnels to store wine, as well as install a bottling operation to draw tourists, but it fell through due to a lack of proper building codes. In the 1970s Nick Clooney wanted to turn parts of the tunnel into an underground mall and a night club, but that fell through early on due to insurance issues. In the 1980s the city pitched the tunnels to Hollywood filmmakers as a location to shoot subway scenes. In particular, the location was presented to the makers of Batman Forever, but as of 2008 the tunnels had not been used in any feature films.

In 2002, a regional light rail system was proposed to use the tunnels; the system would cost $2.6 billion and take thirty years to build. The tunnels were favored because they were in an ideal location, they could easily be used to connect the east side and the west sides of Cincinnati, and they would have saved the city at least $100 million in construction costs at the time. The light rail plan, called MetroMoves, proposed a tax levy that would have raised sales tax in Hamilton county by a half-cent. The plan was voted down by more than a 2-to-1 ratio, with 68% opposing MetroMoves. Still, an underground portion of the Riverfront Transit Center was built to serve the proposed, unbuilt MetroMoves lines; this transit center was later served by another Cincinnati streetcar line, the Cincinnati Bell Connector.

In 2017, shortly after the 100th anniversary of the tunnel construction, mayoral candidate Rob Richardson Jr. ran unsuccessfully on a platform that included reviving the subway system; however, this did not provide tangible construction plans or feasibility studies.

Current status
The uncompleted subway tunnels and stations have been described as "in good shape." This is partially credited to the original construction quality, and partially because Cincinnati needs to maintain the tunnel, using tax revenues, due to the presence of Central Parkway on top of it.

In 2008 it was estimated that it would cost $2.6 million to simply keep maintaining the tunnels, $19 million to fill the tunnels with dirt, and $100.5 million to revive the tunnels for modern subway use. Relocating the  water main would cost $14 million. , the abandoned tunnel is used to carry the relocated water main and some optical fiber cables.

The abandoned tunnels are frequented by urban explorers and the homeless.

Stations and route

Seven stations were completed along Central Parkway: four underground and three above ground. The underground stations remain intact, but the above-ground stations were demolished when I-75 was built in the 1960s. The underground stations' locations are at Race Street, Liberty Street, Linn Street, and Brighton Place, while the above-ground stations' locations were at Marshall Street, Ludlow Avenue, Clifton Avenue, and Reading Road.

The first station was the Race Street Station, which was to serve as the main hub. It was configured with the platform in the center, with the subway running along the north and south side. Next was Liberty Street, which was a through-station. It was a simple design with a platform on each side of the track. Third was Linn Street, also a through station. Laid out similarly to Liberty Street, this station has been sealed up, and can be easily missed when walking through. Fourth was Brighton Place, another through-station.

Marshall Street was the most grand of the above-ground stations, located to the west near the Mill Creek Valley. Ludlow Avenue Station was constructed under the south side of the Ludlow Viaduct and was also a through-station. The last to be completed was Clifton Avenue, which was located where the street passes under present day I-75. There were additional stations in the plan; however, funding ran out as the project reached Norwood.

Engineering
The subway tunnels run north and south. Each tunnel has parallel wooden stringers which are bolted to the floor, and are intended to support steel rails that were never laid.

There were many details of the unfinished subway system, such as a provision for a station at Mohawk Corner, where the wall has been set back. At Walnut Street the lines begin to curve south to go into downtown, but they are stopped short by a bricked-up wall. The subway tunnel is double-tracked throughout its entire length, with a concrete wall separating the two tracks. Openings in the wall enable persons to step from one track to another. The tunnels are well ventilated and provide much light until Liberty Street is reached.

See also
 List of rapid transit systems
 Riverfront Transit Center, a largely unused transportation center in Cincinnati 
 MetroMoves, a never built light rail system in Cincinnati 
 Streetcars in Cincinnati
 Cincinnati Bell Connector, the operational streetcar system in Cincinnati, Ohio

Footnotes

References

Further reading
 
 
"America’s largest abandoned subway is in Cincinnati – and most locals are unaware of It", TheVintageNews.com July 5, 2016

External links

 
 City of Cincinnati - The Cincinnati Subway

Images:
 Cincinnati Subway and Street Improvements, 1916-1955 digital collection. Includes over 9,000 photographs and map.
 Queen City Discovery: Subway 2010 Current photographs of the stations.
 The Cincinnati Subway Additional current photographs of the stations.
 UrbanAdventure.org's tour of the subway in 2002

Studies:
 MetroCincinnati A 2010 vision for rapid transit in the Greater Cincinnati and Northern Kentucky region.
 Cincinnati Subway Revival Study A 2008 study by URS Corporation shows that light rail could be implemented in the original tunnels.

Rapid transit in Ohio
Passenger rail transportation in Cincinnati
Underground rapid transit in the United States
Abandoned rapid transit stations
Cancelled rapid transit lines and systems
Cancelled projects in the United States
Urban exploration